Le Locle railway station is a railway station in the municipality of Le Locle, in the Swiss canton of Neuchâtel.

Services
The following services stop at Le Locle:

References

External links 
 
 

Railway stations in the canton of Neuchâtel
Swiss Federal Railways stations